Kamal Khan Dam is a hydroelectric and irrigation dam project on the Helmand River in Chahar Burjak District of Nimruz Province in south-western Afghanistan. It is located about 95 km to the southeast of Zaranj. Construction work on the dam officially began in 1974 but after the 1978 Saur Revolution, the Americans involved in the construction were compelled to leave Afghanistan and the project was abandoned. It was recently completed.

The hydroelectric plant produces 9 MW of electric power in addition to providing irrigation to about 175,000 hectares (432,434 acres) of agricultural land. Its reservoir has the capacity to store up to 52 million cubic meters of fresh water.

Kamal Khan Dam is managed by Afghanistan's National Water Affairs Regulation Authority (NWARA), which was formerly the Ministry of Energy and Water. Work on the 3rd phase of the dam began on 19 April 2017 by President Ashraf Ghani and members of his administration. The Iranian government has requested that the Afghan government releases more water toward Iran.

Kamal Khan Dam was inaugurated by President Ashraf Ghani on 24 March 2021.

See also
List of dams and reservoirs in Afghanistan
List of rivers of Afghanistan
Water supply in Afghanistan

References

External links
 National Water Affairs Regulation Authority (NWARA)
 Zawia News Kamal Khan Water Dam Latest Report (video in Pashto language, Feb. 4, 2021)
 Nimruz celebrates Kamal Khan Dam progress as reservoir fills up (video in Persian language, Ariana News, Feb. 4, 2021)
 Kamal Khan Dam in Nimroz Province 'Nearly Finished': Official (TOLOnews), Feb. 4, 2021)

Dams in Afghanistan
Hydroelectric power stations in Afghanistan
Buildings and structures in Nimruz Province
Dam controversies
Rock-filled dams